In 1958, a report listing Flagler County, Florida historical sites was compiled for Florida Governor Thomas LeRoy Collins (1909-1991) and the State Park Board. This list included Fort Caben, which was a Second Seminole War fort. The report stated, "…’Fort Caben’ was built for defense against the Indians - about 1834. No trace left. [It was] probably a wood building. Location: Section 38, Township 13- South, Range 29 East, on Fish Hawk Point."

Brief History

Fort Caben was built on the banks of Crescent Lake (near St. Johns Park in present-day Flagler County, Florida) by the U.S. Army during the Second Seminole War to prevent Seminole Indian raiding parties, that were traveling on boats and canoes on the St. Johns River, from attacking and looting the numerous plantations that were located south of St. Augustine. Fort Caben was most likely a blockhouse style fortification as it was located near a waterway, and the area provided a vast number of trees for building materials.

Operations
Fort Caben was likely occupied by U.S. Army troops on a part-time basis during the Second Seminole War for training, reconnaissance and defensive purposes. Many of these smaller and remote forts were not defended on a full-time basis as troops were regularly relocated to areas where there was Seminole Indian activity during the Second Seminole War. No known attacks or skirmishes were recorded at Fort Caben.

Fate
Fort Caben was most likely abandoned, and burned down, sometime around 1839 as no mention of it after this time is documented. Today, the site of Fort Caben is in a densely wooded and secluded area and would most likely require Lidar technology and an experienced archaeologist to locate the exact spot where it was built.

References

External links
 Seminole War Fort Diagram (Ft. Micanopy)
 Florida Seminole Wars Heritage Trail.
 Frontiers: Search on for fort

Seminole Wars
Caben
Buildings and structures in Flagler County, Florida
Pre-statehood history of Florida
Second Seminole War fortifications